The 2020 Lithuanian Swimming Championships  was held in Klaipėda, Lithuania, from 17 December to 19 December.

Events 
Freestyle: 50 m, 100 m, 200 m, 400 m
Backstroke: 50 m, 100 m, 200 m
Breaststroke: 50 m, 100 m, 200 m
Butterfly: 50 m, 100 m, 200 m
Individual medley: 200 m, 400 m
Relay: 4×100 m free, 4×100 m medley

Results

Men's events

Women's events

Mixed events

See also
List of Lithuanian records in swimming

References

Results

External links
Lithuanian Swimming Federation

2020
Sports competitions in Klaipėda
2020 in Lithuanian sport
2020 in swimming